Ani Nyhus (born August 18, 1983) is a Canadian softball pitcher. She played for the University of Oregon during the 2004 and 2005 seasons.  In 2004, she had a record of 25-13 and was named to the All-Pac-10 first team. She was a part of the Canadian Softball team who finished 5th at the 2004 Summer Olympics.

References

1983 births
Canadian softball players
Living people
Olympic softball players of Canada
Oregon Ducks softball players
Sportspeople from Prince George, British Columbia
Sportspeople from British Columbia
Softball players at the 2004 Summer Olympics